Holywell Junction railway station was a junction station located on the north-eastern edge of Holywell and Greenfield, in Flintshire, Wales, on the estuary of the River Dee.

History
The station was opened on 1 May 1848 as part of the Chester and Holyhead Railway (now the North Wales Coast Line) and was named simply Holywell. A brick built signal box was opened in 1902 to replace an earlier wooden one. The station initially had two platforms but as the line grew busier the number of tracks doubled from one each way to two and the number of platforms followed suit. The main station building was positioned on the down platform and a subway connected them all. In 1912 Holywell Branch Line was opened just east of the station which linked the mainline to the centre of Holywell. Therefore, Holywell station was renamed Holywell Junction on 1 May and the new station called Holywell Town.

The branch line lasted 42 years before being closed and Holywell Junction was closed to passengers on 14 February 1966. as part of the Beeching Axe, although it was open to freight until 1970.  The Italianate station building designed by Francis Thompson was listed Grade II* in 1970 and is a private dwelling. The signal box was listed Grade II in 1991.

Proposed reopening as Greenfield 
Proposals to reopen a station in Greenfield, either on or near the former Holywell Junction railway station site, has been announced in 2019, with Holywell Town Council and its Mayor supporting a case to reopen a railway station. The proposals to reopen are largely based on that the state of the former station platforms remain highly intact. The owner of the old station house, now a private property, announced their property will not be part of any station reopening. In July 2020, the Welsh Government included a proposal for a station named "Holywell" in their long-term aspirations for the North Wales Coast Line. In September 2021, Transport for Wales released its future developments plan, with a station named "Greenfield" marked as proposed in their short-term section of the plan to 2029. Hannah Blythyn, MS for Delyn welcomed the plans for a new station. In January 2022, Rob Roberts MP for Delyn took part in an adjournment debate in the House of Commons to raise the issue with Parliamentary Under Secretary, Robert Courts.

References

Further reading

Disused railway stations in Flintshire
Former London and North Western Railway stations
Beeching closures in Wales
Railway stations in Great Britain opened in 1848
Grade II* listed buildings in Flintshire
Railway stations in Great Britain closed in 1966
Francis Thompson railway stations
Grade II* listed railway stations in Wales
Greenfield